Clan MacLennan, also known as Siol Ghillinnein, is a Highland Scottish clan which historically populated lands in the north-west of Scotland. The surname MacLennan in Scottish Gaelic is Mac Gille Fhinnein, meaning the son of the follower of St Finnan.

History

Origins
The MacLennans settled around Kintail and were related to the Clan Logan. However some historians have said that Logan was the original name of the clan with MacLennan not coming into use until the fifteenth century.

In the fifteenth century a feud took place between the clans Logan and Fraser. Gillegorm Logan led his clan towards Inverness to attack the Frasers but was ambushed and most of his men were killed in the battle, that took place  at North Kessock. The Clan Logan chief, Gilligorm, was amongst those killed. Gilligorm's pregnant widow was captured by the Frasers and soon gave birth to a child. The Frasers intentionally broke the child's back, who was named Crotair MacGilligorm because of his deformity. Another version of the story is that the child was actually born deformed and was placed with the monks at Beauly Priory. However he disregarded the decree of Pope Innocent III and instead preferred to follow Celtic practices. He married and had children and it is from his Gaelic name Gille Finnan that the clan's name of MacLennan was adopted.

The heraldry of the MacLennans and the Logans is similar and alludes to the historic link between the two clans.

Crotair MacGilligorm was educated by the monks at Beauly Priory and later founded churches at Kilmor, Sleat and Kilchrinin, Glenelg. His son, called Gille Fhinnein, is the supposed progenitor of the Clan MacLennan.

15th century and clan conflicts

The shield of the chief of the Clan MacLennan also shows their link to the Clan Mackenzie, whose banner was the caber-feidh. The Clan MacLennan along with the Clan Macrae were strong supporters of the Mackenzies and may at one time have been custodians of the Mackenzie's castle at Eilean Donan.

In 1452 the Clan MacLennan as septs or allies of the Clan Mackenzie of Kintail fought at the Battle of Bealach nam Broig against the Frasers under Lord Lovat and the Munros of Foulis:

"A desperate skirmish, which took place some time before this, at Bealach nam Broig, "betwixt the heights of Fearann Donuil and Lochbraon," was brought about by some of Mackenzie of Kintail's vassals, instigated by Donald Garbh Maciver attempting to seize the Earl of Ross, but the plot having been discovered, Maciver was seized by the Earl of Ross, Lord of the Isles' followers, and imprisoned in Dingwall. He was soon releawsed, however, by his undaunted countrymen from Kenlochewe, followers of Mackenzie of Kintial, consisting of Macivers, Maclennans, Macaulays, and Macleays, who, by way of reprisal, pursued and seized the Earl's son at Balnagown, and carried him along with them. His father, Earl John, at once apprised the Lord Lovat, who was then His Majesty's Lieutenant in the North, of the illegal seizure of his son, and he at once dispatched sic northward two hundred men, who, joined by Ross's vassals, the Munros of Fowlis, and the Dingwalls of Kildun, pursued and overtook the western tribes at Bealach nam Broig, where they were resting themselves. A desperate and bloody conflict ensued, aggravated and exasperated by a keen and bitter recollection of ancient feud and animosities. The Kenlochewe men (Macivers, Maclennans, Macaulays, and Macleays) seem to have been completely extirpated and defeated. The race of Dingwall was actually extinguished, one hundred and forty of their men having been slain, and the Munro family of Fowlis although rescuing the hostage, lost eleven members of their house alone, with many of the leading men of their clan.

17th century and Civil War
During the Civil War the Clan MacLennan came to prominence as followers of the Mackenzie chief. The Mackenzie chief was a Covenanter who fought against the royalist commander James Graham, 1st Marquis of Montrose. The MacLennans and Mackenzies fought against the royalists at the Battle of Auldearn in 1645 but were defeated. At the battle the Clan MacLennan were led by their chief Ruaridh, a red-bearded giant standing well over six feet tall.

James Graham the Marquess of Montrose was heavily outnumbered but his strategic genius more than compensated for it. He massed his banners, hoping to deceive the enemy as to the location of his main force. The ruse succeeded, forcing the Covenanters to mass their forces for a full assault. Graham the Marquess of Montrose outflanked Lord Mackenzie of Seaforth, turning the tide of battle in his favour. The Maclennans were sent an order to withdraw, but it was never delivered. Ruaridh and his men fought to the last, defending Seaforth’s standard. They were finally cut down by the Clan Gordon cavalry.

18th century and Jacobite risings

The decimated Clan MacLennan played little part in the Jacobite risings, however eleven MacLennans are recorded as being taken prisoner after the Battle of Culloden. After Culloden the clan system began to fall apart and many MacLennans emigrated to the new world. There are MacLennan Mountains in New Zealand and a McLennan County in the state of Texas, USA.

Clan MacLennan today

Prior to 1976 there had not been a recognized MacLennan chief for over three hundred years. In 1977, the Lord Lyon King of Arms recognised Ronald George MacLennan as the 'Chief of the Name and Arms of MacLennan'. However, another man, William MacLennan from Sydney, Australia, came forward with proof of his descent, in the male line, from the senior line of the clan. This man's arms were then matriculated by the Lord Lyon King of Arms, yet he did not contest Ronald MacLennan's chiefship despite his senior descent. Ronald's son and heir Ruairidh Donald George MacLennan of MacLennan became Scotland's youngest clan chief at the age of 13 following his father's death in 1989. In 1990, William MacLennan challenged the Chiefship by way of a petition to the Lord Lyons Court. The matter was only resolved in 2000 after William's son who inherited the Chieftainship from his father in 1990 withdrew the legal challenge to the Chiefship. The son of William MacLennan, however, still retained the option of to contest the chiefship. The modern day Clan MacLennan has active associations in Scotland, Australia, Canada, the USA and New Zealand. The clan chief resides in Dores, Inverness, Scotland.

Clan profile

Clan chief: The current chief of the clan is Ruairidh Donald George MacLennan of MacLennan, Chief of the Name and Arms of MacLennan.
Chiefly arms: The current chief's coat of arms is blazoned: Or, a heart of Gules between two passion nails joined in base Sable, on a chief Azure a stag's head cabossed between two antique crowns, all of the First.
Chief's war cry: Druim nan deur, which translates from Scottish Gaelic as "the ridge of tears".
Clan member's crest badge: The crest badge suitable for clan members contains the chief's heraldic crest and motto. The crest is: A demi-piper all Proper, garbed in the proper tartan of the Clan MacLennan.  However, there exists another crest showing a folded arm bearing a sword. The motto is: Dum spiro spero. The motto translates from Latin as "while i breathe i hope".
Clan badge: The plant badge of Clan MacLennan is furze.
Clan tartan: Clans MacLennan and Logan share the same tartan.

See also
Clan Logan, which has been associated with the Clan MacLennan.
MacLennan, list of notable MacLennans

References

Sources

(194?). The Scottish Tartans, With Historical Sketches of the Clans and Families of Scotland. W & A K Johnston, Ltd. (Edinburgh).

External links

Clan MacLennan.scot
Clan MacLennan Facebook
Clan MacLennan Twitter
Clan MacLennan Instagram
Clan MacLennan Worldwide

MacLennan